Arlette is a 1997 French comedy-romance film directed by Claude Zidi.

Plot
Arlette is a waitress at the "Centipede", a roadside restaurant in the middle of rural France. Loudmouth at the heart while rather romantic, she dreams of getting married but Victor, her boyfriend, a lorry driver, does not want to hear about it. One day, a charming prince, Frank, an American millionaire, arrives at the Centipede in a white limousine. Claiming to be depressed after his girlfriend's death, he seeks for Arlette's help and starts to seduce her with gifts and charming words. He eventually offers to take her to Las Vegas to marry her. But what is this seductive playboy truly after?

Cast

 Josiane Balasko as Arlette Bathiat
 Christopher Lambert as Frank Martin
 Ennio Fantastichini as Angelo Mascarpone
 Stéphane Audran as Diane
 Jean-Marie Bigard as Victor
 Armelle as Lucie
 Martin Lamotte as The Chief
 Ronny Coutteure as Arlette's boss
 Jean-Pierre Castaldi as Lulu
 France Zobda as Samantha
 Jean-Claude Bouillon as The host
 Bouli Lanners as Emile
 Jed Allan as Wide
 Mathieu Demy as Julien
 Arno Chevrier as Mickey
 Tony Librizzi as Riri
 Pascal Benezech as Nanard
 Lionel Robert as Marcel
 Justin Hubbard as David Gafferson
 Isabelle Leprince as Brigitte
 David Fresco as Assler
 Renée Lee as Doris
 Junior Ray as Goliath
 Patrick Bordier as The monk
 Jacques Le Carpentier as The big guy

Reception
Arlette opened in third place at the French box office with a gross of $1.7 million from 333 screens.

References

External links

1997 films
1997 romantic comedy films
French romantic comedy films
1990s French-language films
Films produced by Claude Berri
Films directed by Claude Zidi
1990s French films